Lellingeria is a genus of ferns in the family Polypodiaceae, subfamily Grammitidoideae, according to the Pteridophyte Phylogeny Group classification of 2016 (PPG I).

About 50–70 species of Lellingeria are known. They are native to tropical areas of Madagascar, Africa, the Americas, and Pacific Islands. None are known in cultivation. Lellingeria was named for the American pteridologist David Lellinger.

Description
Mostly epiphytes. Rhizome radially symmetrical or dorsiventral, with clathrate, usually blackish scales that are attached across their entire base. Petiole absent or much shorter than the lamina. Sterile portion of frond shallowly to deeply pinnately divided. Fertile portion entire to deeply pinnately divided. (A few species with fronds  pinnate-pinnatifid). Veins simple, free (not anastomosing). Hydathodes present. Sori round or elliptic, often slightly sunken, without paraphyses.

Taxonomy
The genus Lellingeria was erected in 1991. At that time, it consisted of 52 species, three newly described, and 49 transferred from the artificial (unnatural) genus Grammitis. In 2004, a phylogenetic study of DNA sequences of two chloroplast genes showed that Lellingeria, as defined in 1991, was polyphyletic. This was confirmed six years later. In 2010, four species were removed from Lellingeria and combined with one species from the defunct genus Xiphopteris to form the new genus Leucotrichum. The remaining species of Lellingeria form a monophyletic genus that is sister to the genus Melpomene.

When Lellingeria was established in 1991, thirty-five of its species were assigned to four species groups. This infra-generic classification did not hold up, because one of these groups had to be separated as Leucotrichum, and because another two of these groups were not truly distinct, but intermixed. Lellingeria, as currently circumscribed consists of two groups, one with about 20 species, and another with about 50. The smaller group is easily distinguished by morphological characters, but the larger group is more diverse. These two groups have not been formally named as subgenera or sections within Lellingeria.

Lellingeria can be distinguished from Melpomene by the lack of setae, the presence of hairs on the rhizome, the sparse covering of very short hair on the upper surface of the rachis or midrib, and by the sori, which are slightly sunken into the lamina.

When Lellingeria was first described in 1991, it was thought to always have a radially symmetrical rhizome, but it has since been learned that some of the species that belong in Lellingeria have a dorsiventral rhizome. The unequally forked hairs are almost always present, but they are not a synapomorphy for Lellingeria.

Species
, the Checklist of Ferns and Lycophytes of the World accepted the following species:

Lellingeria affinis Labiak
Lellingeria amplisora Labiak
Lellingeria antillensis (Proctor) A.R.Sm. & R.C.Moran
Lellingeria apiculata (Kunze ex Klotzsch) A.R.Sm. & R.C.Moran
Lellingeria barbensis (Lellinger) A.R.Sm. er R.C.Moran
Lellingeria bishopii Labiak
Lellingeria brasiliensis (Rosenst.) Labiak
Lellingeria brevistipes (Mett. ex Kuhn) A.R.Sm. & R.C.Moran
Lellingeria calolepis Labiak
Lellingeria ciliolepis (C.Chr.) A.R.Sm.
Lellingeria depressa (C.Chr.) A.R.Sm. & R.C.Moran
Lellingeria dissimulans (Maxon) A.R.Sm.
Lellingeria epiphytica (Copel.) A.R.Sm. & R.C.Moran
Lellingeria flagellipinnata M.Kessler & A.R.Sm.
Lellingeria flexibilis Labiak
Lellingeria hombersleyi (Maxon) A.R.Sm.
Lellingeria humilis (Mett.) A.R.Sm. & R.C.Moran
Lellingeria isidrensis (Maxon ex Copel.) A.R.Sm. & R.C.Moran
Lellingeria itatimensis (C.Chr.) A.R.Sm. & R.C.Moran
Lellingeria jimenezii Labiak
Lellingeria kaieteura (Jenman) Labiak
Lellingeria labiakii Sundue
Lellingeria laxifolia A.R.Sm. & R.C.Moran
Lellingeria longeattenuata D.M.Forero & J.Murillo
Lellingeria longifolia Labiak
Lellingeria major (Copel.) A.R.Sm. & R.C.Moran
Lellingeria melanotrichia (Baker) A.R.Sm. & R.C.Moran
Lellingeria micula (Lellinger) Labiak
Lellingeria militaris (Maxon) A.R.Sm. & R.C.Moran
Lellingeria moranii Labiak
Lellingeria oreophila (Maxon) A.R.Sm. & R.C.Moran
Lellingeria paramicola Labiak
Lellingeria pendula (Sw.) A.R.Sm. & R.C.Moran
Lellingeria pendulina A.R.Sm. & R.C.Moran
Lellingeria phlegmaria (J.Sm.) A.R.Sm. & R.C.Moran
Lellingeria pinnata A.Rojas
Lellingeria pseudocapillaris (Rosenst.) A.R.Sm. & R.C.Moran
Lellingeria pseudotenuicula Labiak
Lellingeria randallii (Maxon) A.R.Sm. & R.C.Moran
Lellingeria simacensis (Rosenst.) A.R.Sm. & R.C.Moran
Lellingeria sinuosa (A.R.Sm.) A.R.Sm. & R.C.Moran
Lellingeria smithii Labiak
Lellingeria subimpressa (Copel.) Labiak
Lellingeria subsessilis (Baker) A.R.Sm. & R.C.Moran
Lellingeria suprasculpta (Christ) A.R.Sm. & R.C.Moran
Lellingeria suspensa (L.) A.R.Sm. & R.C.Moran
Lellingeria tamandarei (Rosenst.) A.R.Sm. & R.C.Moran
Lellingeria tenuicula (Fée) A.R.Sm. & R.C.Moran
Lellingeria tmesipteris (Copel.) A.R.Sm. & R.C.Moran
Lellingeria tunguraguae (Rosenst.) A.R.Sm. & R.C.Moran
Lellingeria vargasiana A.Rojas

References

Polypodiaceae
Fern genera